Shetvan (also Romanized as Shetvān) is a village in Darz and Sayeban Rural District, in the Central District of Larestan County, Fars Province, Iran. At the 2006 census, its population was 212, in 47 families.

References 

Populated places in Larestan County